Bassetville is a ghost town in Decatur County, Kansas, United States.

History
Bassetville was issued a post office in 1879. The post office was discontinued in 1908.

References

Further reading

External links
 Decatur County maps: Current, Historic, KDOT

Former populated places in Decatur County, Kansas
Former populated places in Kansas